San Lorenzo Municipality may refer to:

 San Lorenzo Municipality, Pando in Madre de Dios Province, Bolivia
 San Lorenzo Municipality, Tarija in Eustaquio Méndez Province, Bolivia
 San Lorenzo, Nariño, Colombia
 San Lorenzo, Ahuachapán, El Salvador
 San Lorenzo, Suchitepéquez, Guatemala
 San Lorenzo, Valle, Honduras
 San Lorenzo, Oaxaca, Mexico
 San Lorenzo, Boaco, Nicaragua
 San Lorenzo, Guimaras, Philippines
 San Lorenzo, Puerto Rico

Municipality name disambiguation pages